Dan Danknick is a physicist and roboticist who graduated from UCI and has made several appearances on robotics related television shows.

Battlebots
Danknick gained comedic notoriety in the robotics community with his appearances on the Comedy Central show Battlebots.  The robot created by his Team Delta, Hazard, was consistently one of the highest ranked middleweight robots in the entire competition.

Robotica
Danknick hosted the TLC show Robotica for the second and third seasons, acting as a technical commentator.

SERVO Magazine
Danknick served as the first technical editor of SERVO Magazine, the robotics publication.  He was also a driving force behind the magazine's robotics competition, Tetsujin.

References

External links

21st-century American physicists
Year of birth missing (living people)
Living people
American roboticists